The Education Reform Act 1988 is widely regarded as the most important single piece of education legislation in England and Wales since the 'Butler' Education Act 1944.

Provisions
The main provisions of the Education Reform Act are as follows:

 Academic tenure was abolished for academics appointed on or after 20 November 1987.
 An element of choice was introduced, where parents could specify which school was their preferred choice.
 City Technology Colleges (CTCs) were introduced. This part of the Act allowed new more autonomous schools to be taken out of the direct financial control of local authorities. Financial control would be handed to the head teacher and governors of a school. There was also a requirement for partial private funding. There were only fifteen schools that were eventually set up. The successor to this programme was the establishment of academies.
 Controls on the use of the word 'degree' were introduced with respect to UK bodies.
 Grant-maintained schools (GMS) were introduced. Primary and secondary schools could, under this provision, remove themselves fully from their respective local education authorities and would be completely funded by central government. Secondary schools also had limited selection powers at the age of eleven.
 'Key Stages' (KS) were introduced in schools. At each key stage a number of educational objectives were to be achieved.
 Local management of schools (LMS) was introduced. This part of the Act allowed all schools to be taken out of the direct financial control of local authorities. Financial control would be handed to the head teacher and governors of a school. For further education colleges, the greater autonomy brought in by the 1988 Act was extended by the Further and Higher Education Act 1992 to become complete independence of local authority control, as colleges were 'incorporated'.
 The National Curriculum (NC) was introduced.

Commencement

Use of the word 'degree'
The Act uses a common technique in UK legislation in that it makes it illegal to offer or advertise any qualification that appears to be, or might be mistaken for, a UK degree.

This restriction is then removed in respect of qualifications from bodies on a list maintained by statutory instrument.

Religion
The act required "broadly Christian" acts of worship in schools. The National Muslim Education Council objected and requested that the wording to be changed to "the worship of the one supreme God".

This requirement was built upon in the School Standards and Framework Act 1998.

References

United Kingdom Acts of Parliament 1988
United Kingdom Education Acts
Education in England
1988 in education
Reform in the United Kingdom
Education reform
July 1988 events in the United Kingdom